Jean LeClerc (born July 7, 1948) is a Canadian actor best known for his work in the United States as Jeremy Hunter on the American daytime soap operas All My Children and Loving in the 1980s and 1990s.

Career 
LeClerc first started his career in Quebec on the television series Les Belles Histoires des pays d'en haut. Roles in Québécois movies followed, culminating in his first English-speaking role in the 1976 Canadian film, Strange Shadows in an Empty Room. That same year, he acted in a television miniseries about the life of Sarah Bernhardt, playing the role of Bernhardt's husband Jacques Damala, and the following year he played a film director in the horror anthology film The Uncanny. LeClerc moved to the United States in 1982, playing the part of a French doctor on the soap opera The Doctors. He played similar roles on The Edge of Night and As the World Turns before being offered the role of American Jeremy Hunter in 1985.

In 1991, LeClerc and his All My Children costar Genie Francis made an extended appearance on another ABC soap opera Loving for the November sweeps period in an effort to boost the show's ratings. LeClerc left All My Children in 1992 to join Loving full-time until his character was killed off in 1995. In 2001, LeClerc briefly reappeared on All My Children, with his character Jeremy appearing as a ghost.

LeClerc most recently appeared in a Patty Duke Show television reunion special and in the 2005 film Idole instantanée. He also appeared on Broadway as the title character in a production of Dracula.

Filmography

Film

Television

References

External links

Canadian male soap opera actors
Canadian male television actors
Male actors from Montreal
1948 births
Living people